Ridgeon is a surname. Notable people with the surname include:

Angela Ridgeon, British actress
Jon Ridgeon (born 1967), English hurdler